Paul Andre Cyr (October 31, 1963 – May 12, 2012) was a Canadian professional ice hockey left wing who played for the Buffalo Sabres, New York Rangers and Hartford Whalers in the National Hockey League (NHL).

Career
Cyr began his career with the Nanaimo Clippers of the British Columbia Hockey League, for whom he played the 1979–80 season, and then the Victoria Cougars of the Western Hockey League from 1980 to 1982. He was a member of the first Canadian team to win a gold medal at the World Junior Hockey Championship in 1982. Cyr only made the team after being recalled due to another player's injury. He scored in the Boxing Day game versus the Soviet Union. In the tournament, he scored a total of four goals and ten points in the ten games he played.

The Buffalo Sabres drafted Cyr ninth overall in the 1982 NHL Entry Draft. He made his debut for the Sabres that year, and played the next six seasons for the team, before being traded midway through the 1987–88 season to the New York Rangers in exchange for Mike Donnelly and a fifth round draft pick. After two injury-plagued seasons with the Rangers, Cyr signed as a free agent with the Hartford Whalers before the 1990–91 season. He had one successful year with the Whalers, appearing in 70 games and scoring 25 points. He was demoted to the Springfield Indians of the American Hockey League the subsequent year, where remained until his retirement in 1993.

Cyr played in a total of 470 games in the NHL over nine seasons, scoring 101 goals and 140 assists.

Personal life and death
In 1987, Cyr was shot in the stomach while vacationing in the Dominican Republic. He recovered. His house burned down during his retirement, which he rebuilt himself. Cyr died of heart failure in May 2012.

Career statistics

Regular season and playoffs

International

Awards
 WHL Second All-Star Team – 1982

References

External links

1963 births
2012 deaths
Buffalo Sabres draft picks
Buffalo Sabres players
Canadian ice hockey left wingers
Hartford Whalers players
Ice hockey people from British Columbia
Nanaimo Clippers players
National Hockey League first-round draft picks
New York Rangers players
People from Port Alberni
Victoria Cougars (WHL) players